Nancy Kwan Ka-shen (born May 19, 1939) is a Chinese-American actress, philanthropist, and former dancer. In addition to her personality and looks, her career was benefited by Hollywood's casting of more Asian roles in the 1960s, especially in comedies.

Biography

Early life

Born in Hong Kong on May 19, 1939, and growing up in Kowloon Tong, Kwan is the Eurasian daughter of Kwan Wing-hong, a Cantonese architect and Marquita Scott, a European model of English and Scottish ancestry. Kwan Wing-hong was the son of lawyer Kwan King-sun and Juliann Loke Yuen-ying, daughter of Loke Yew. He attended Cambridge University and met Scott in London. The two married and moved to Hong Kong, where Wing-hong became an eminent architect. In that era, interracial marriage was not universally accepted. Nancy has an older brother, Ka-keung.

In fear of the Japanese invasion of Hong Kong during World War II, Wing Hong, in the guise of a coolie, escaped from Hong Kong to North China in Christmas 1941 with his two children, whom he hid in wicker baskets. Kwan and her brother were transported by servants, evading Japanese sentries. They remained in exile in western China for five years until the war ended, after which they returned to Hong Kong and lived in a spacious, contemporary home her father designed. Scott escaped to England and never rejoined the family. Kwan's parents divorced when she was two years old. Her mother later moved to New York and married an American. Remaining in Hong Kong with the children, her father married a Chinese woman, whom Kwan called "Mother". Her father and her stepmother raised her, in addition to her brother and five half-brothers and half-sisters. Five of Kwan's siblings became lawyers.

Except during World War II, Kwan had a comfortable early life. Cared for by an amah (阿嬤), a woman who looks after children, Kwan owned a pony and passed her summers in resorts in Borneo, Macao, and Japan. An affluent man, her father owned a several-acre hilltop property in Kowloon. In her youth, she was called "Ka-shen". She wrote in 1960 that as an eight-year-old, her fortune-teller "predicted travel, fame, and fortune for me".

Kwan attended the Catholic Maryknoll Convent School until she was 13 years old, after which she travelled to Kingsmoor School in Glossop, England a boarding school that her brother Ka-keung was then attending. Her brother studied to become an architect and she studied to become a dancer.

Kwan's introduction to tai chi sparked a desire to learn ballet. When Kwan was 18, she pursued her dream of becoming a ballet dancer by attending the Royal Ballet School in London. She studied performing arts subjects such as stage make-up and danced every day for four hours. Her studies at the Royal Ballet School ran concurrently with her high-school studies. Because Kwan's high school had deep connections with nearby theatre companies, Kwan was able to perform small parts in several of their productions. Upon graduating from high school, she sojourned in France, Italy, and Switzerland on a luxury trip. Afterwards, she travelled back to Hong Kong, where she started a ballet school.

Early career 
Stage producer Ray Stark posted an advertisement in the Hong Kong Tiger Standard (later renamed The Standard) regarding auditions for the character Suzie Wong for a play. The ad asked applicants to present their pictures, résumés, and proportions. Kwan submitted the application and was discovered by Stark in a film studio constructed by her architect father. After auditioning for Stark, she was asked to screen test to play a character in the prospective film The World of Suzie Wong. Stark preferred Kwan over the other women because she "would have more universal acceptance". Another auditionee, French actress France Nuyen, played the stage version of the role and had been called a "businessman's delight" by a number of reviewers. Stark disliked this characterization, as well as "happy harlot" characters such as Melina Mercouri in Never on Sunday. Stark wanted an Asian actress because reconfiguring the eyes of a white actress would merely look artificial. He also praised Kwan's features: an "acceptable face" and "being alluringly leggy [and] perfectly formed".

For each screen test, Kwan, accompanied by her younger sister, was chauffeured to the studio by her father's driver. Stark characterized Kwan's first screen test as "pretty dreadful" but one that hinted at her potential. After four weeks of training with drama teachers, including hours of lessons with Pulitzer Prize–winning playwright–screenwriter John Patrick, Kwan's second screen test was a significant improvement. Although she had not yet become an actress, Stark said, there was a "development of her authority". Once, upon viewing her screen test, Kwan said, "I'm a terrible girl" and "squealed with embarrassment"; acting as a prostitute was a vastly different experience from her comfortable life with her affluent father. The reaction prompted Stark to refrain from letting her view the dailies. Kwan did a third screen test after four months had passed, and a deadlock existed between whether to choose Kwan or Nuyen.

Owing to Kwan's lack of acting experience, at Stark's request she travelled to the United States, where she attended acting school in Hollywood and resided in the Hollywood Studio Club, a chaperoned dormitory with other junior actresses. She later moved to New York. Kwan signed a seven-year contract with Stark's Seven Arts Productions at a beginning salary of $300 a week, even though she was not given a distinct role. In 2005, Edward S. Feldman and Tom Barton characterized Kwan's wages and her employment as "indentured servitude". In a retrospective interview, Kwan told Goldsea that she had no prior acting experience and that the $300 a week salary was "a lot of money to me then".

When The World of Suzie Wong began to tour, Kwan was assigned the part of a bargirl. In addition to her small supporting character role, Kwan became an understudy for the production's female lead, France Nuyen. Though Stark and the male lead William Holden preferred Kwan despite her somewhat apprehensive demeanor during the screen test, she did not get the role. Paramount favored the eminent France Nuyen, who had been widely praised for her performance in the film South Pacific (1958). Stark acquiesced to Paramount's wishes. Nuyen received the role and Kwan later took the place of Nuyen on Broadway. In a September 1960 interview with Associated Press journalist Bob Thomas, she said, "I was bitterly disappointed, and I almost quit and went home when I didn't get the picture." Kwan did not receive the lead role because Stark believed she was too inexperienced at the time. Nuyen won the title role in the upcoming movie because of her powerful portrayal of Suzie Wong during the tour. She moved to England to film the movie, leaving an opening for Kwan to ascend to the lead female role in the touring production. In 1959, one month after Nuyen was selected for the film role and while Kwan was touring in Toronto, Stark told her to screen test again for the film. Kwan responded to his phone call from London, asking, "How can I come? I'm in this show." To provide a pretext for Kwan's sudden hiatus from the touring production, Stark sent a cablegram to her superiors saying her father had become ill and had been hospitalized. Kwan later recalled in an interview about three years later, "So I went to the manager and told him a lie. It was not very nice, but what could I do?" After Kwan accepted the role, the Broadway play producer sued her for leaving with little notice.

Nuyen, who was in an unstable relationship with Marlon Brando, had a nervous breakdown and was fired from the role because of her erratic actions. The film's director, Jean Negulesco, was fired and replaced by Richard Quine. Kwan, who previously had never been in a film, defeated 30 competitors from Hollywood, France, Japan, Korea, and the Philippines. On February 15, 1960, she began filming the movie in London with co-star William Holden. During the filming, Kwan's only trouble was a lingerie scene. Robert Lomax, as played by Holden, tears off her Western dress and says, "Wear your own kind of clothing! Don't try to copy some European girl!" Director Richard Quine was displeased with Kwan's underclothes: She wore a full-slip rather than a half-slip and bra. Finding the attire too modest and unrealistic, he asked Stark to talk to Kwan. Stark discovered Kwan taking refuge in her dressing room, sobbing grievously. He warned her, "Nancy, wear the half-slip and bra or you're off the picture. France Nuyen is no longer in it, remember? If you're difficult you'll be off it too. All we want to do is make you the best actress possible." Kwan returned to the set after lunch, aloofly wearing a bra and half-slip, acting as if what had happened earlier had not transpired.

Owing to Kwan's perceptible Eurasian appearance, the film's make-up artists endeavored to make her look more Chinese. They plucked her eyebrows and sketched a line across her forehead. In movies where Kwan plays Asian roles, the makeup artists reshape her brown eyes. Gossip columnist Hedda Hopper wrote that Kwan, as a Eurasian, does not look fully Asian or European. Hopper wrote that the "scattering of freckles across her tip-tilted nose give her an Occidental flavor". The production spanned five months, an unusually lengthy period for the era.

Stardom

The World of Suzie Wong was a "box-office sensation". Critics lavished praise on Kwan for her performance. She was given the nickname "Chinese Bardot" for her unforgettable dance performance. Kwan and two other actresses, Ina Balin and Hayley Mills, were awarded the Golden Globe for the "Most Promising Newcomer–Female" in 1960. The following year, she was voted a "Star of Tomorrow". Scholar Jennifer Leah Chan of New York University wrote that Suzie provided an Asian actress—Kwan—with the most significant Hollywood role since actress Anna May Wong's success in the 1920s.

Following The World of Suzie Wong, Kwan was unprepared for fame. While she was purchasing fabric in a store on Nathan Road, she found people staring at her from the window. Wondering what they were staring at, it suddenly struck her that she was the point of attraction. Kwan remarked that in Beverly Hills, she can walk without attracting notice. She rationalized, "[It] is better in America because America is much bigger, I guess". When people addressed her father after watching the film, they frequently called him "Mr. Wong", a name that severely displeased him. Kwan said in a 1994 interview with the South China Morning Post that even decades after her film debut and despite her having done over 50 films thence, viewers continued to send numerous letters to her about the film.

The scene of Kwan, reposed on a davenport and adorned in a dazzling cheongsam, while showing a "deliciously decadent flash of thigh", became an iconic image. Clad in a cheongsam—"a Chinese dress with a high collar and slits, one on each side of the skirt"—Kwan was on the October 1960 cover of Life, cementing her status as an eminent sex symbol in the 1960s. Nicknamed the "Suzie Wong dress", the cheongsam in the portrait spawned thousands of copycat promotional projects. In a 1962 interview, Kwan said she "loved" the cheongsam, calling it a "national costume". She explained that it "has slits because Chinese girls have pretty legs" and "the slits show their legs".

Chinese and Chinese-Americans became aggrieved after seeing how Chinese women were depicted as promiscuous. Tom Lisanti and Louis Paul speculated that the wave of unfavorable media attention drove filmmakers to escalate the production of Kwan's next film. In 1961, she starred in Flower Drum Song in a related role. The film was distinguished for being the "first big-budget American film" with an all-Asian cast. Kwan did not sing the songs in the musical film; the vocals for Linda Low were performed by B. J. Baker. Comparing Suzie Wong and Flower Drum Song, she found the latter much harder because the girl she played was "more go-getter". Her prior ballet education provided a strong foundation for her role in Flower Drum Song, where she had much space to dance.

After starring in The World of Suzie Wong and Flower Drum Song, Kwan experienced a meteoric rise to celebrity. Scholar Jennifer Leah Chan of New York University chronicled the media attention Kwan received after starring in two Hollywood films, writing that Kwan's fame peaked in 1962. In addition to being featured on the cover of Life magazine, Kwan was the subject of a 1962 article in a popular women's magazine, McCall's, entitled "The China Doll that Men Like".

As a Hollywood icon, Kwan lived in a house atop Laurel Canyon in Los Angeles. She commuted in a white British sports car and danced to Latin verses. She enjoyed listening to Johnny Mathis records and reading Chinese history texts. In 1962 (when she was 22), Kwan was dating Swiss actor Maximilian Schell. In an interview that year, she said she did not intend to get married until she was older, perhaps 24 or 25. She said a number of Americans married just to leave home or to "make love". Kwan said this was problematic because she found dialogue and an ability to appreciate and express humor important in a marriage: "You can't just sit around and stare at walls between love-making."

In 1961, Kwan offered to work as a teacher for King's Own Yorkshire Light Infantry. The infantry was training for military involvement in Malaya (now part of Malaysia), and the regiment's commanders believed that the infantrymen should be taught the Chinese language and how to handle chopsticks. Captain Anthony Hare announced to the public that the infantry needed a teacher – an attractive one. He later acknowledged that he appended the teacher "must be attractive" so that more soldiers would attend the sessions. Kwan, in Hollywood at the time, replied via cable: "Please consider me a candidate as Chinese teacher for Yorkshire Light Infantry. I am fluent in Chinese, fabulous with chopsticks, and fond of uniforms." Captain Hare commented, "Miss Kwan is too beautiful. I think she would be too much of a distraction." Her tardy request was not evaluated, as the infantry had already accepted the application of another Chinese woman.

The Nancy Kwan Cut
In 1963, Nancy Kwan's long hair, famous from The World of Suzie Wong, was chopped into a sharp modernist bob by Vidal Sassoon for the film The Wild Affair, at the request of director John Krish. Designed by London hairdresser Vidal Sassoon, Kwan's bob cut in the film drew widespread media attention for the "severe geometry of her new hairstyle". Sassoon's signature cut of Kwan's hair was nicknamed "the Kwan cut", "the Kwan bob", or was plainly known as "the Kwan"; photographs of Kwan's new hairstyle appeared in both the American and British editions of Vogue.

Later films
Kwan's success in her early career was not mirrored in later years, due to the cultural nature of 1960s America. Ann Lloyd and Graham Fuller wrote in their book The Illustrated Who's Who of the Cinema: "Her Eurasian beauty and impish sense of humor could not sustain her stardom". Her later films were marked by multifarious parts, comprising movie and television roles for American and European productions. Kwan discovered that she had to journey to Europe and Hong Kong to escape the ethnic typecasting in Hollywood that confined her largely to Asian roles in spite of her Eurasian appearance.

Her third movie was the British drama film The Main Attraction (1962) with Pat Boone. She played an Italian circus performer who was the love interest of Boone's character. While she was filming the movie in the Austrian Alps, she met Peter Pock, a hotelier and ski teacher, with whom she immediately fell in love. She reflected, "The first time I saw that marvelous-looking man I said, 'That's for me.'" After several weeks, the two married and resided in Innsbruck, Tyrol, Austria. Kwan later gave birth to Bernhard "Bernie" Pock. In December 1963, Pock was constructing a luxury hotel in the Tyrolean Alps. During Christmas of that year, Nancy Kwan visited the location and was able to participate in several pre-1964 Winter Olympics events despite having been very occupied with movies. Her contract with film production company Seven Arts led her to travel around the world to film movies. She found the separation from her son, Bernie, who was not yet a year old, difficult. She said, "He's coming into a time when he's beginning to assert his personality." Fair-skinned and blue-eyed, Bernie had his father's appearance.

In 1963, Kwan starred as the title character of Tamahine. Because of her role, she went to the optician to get contact lenses so she would look blue-eyed. Playing an English-Tahitian ward of the head master at an old English public school, she was praised by the Boston Globe for her "charming depict[ion]" of the character.

In Fate Is the Hunter (1964), her seventh film, Kwan played an ichthyologist. It was her first role as a Eurasian character. Kwan's roles were predominantly comic characters, which she said were more difficult roles than "straight dramatic work" owing to the necessity of more vigor and precise timing.

Kwan met Bruce Lee when he choreographed the martial arts moves in the film The Wrecking Crew (1969). In Kwan's role in the film, she fought the character played by Sharon Tate by throwing a flying kick. Her martial arts move was based not on karate training, but on her dance foundation. Author Darrell Y. Hamamoto noted that this "ironically" twisted Kwan's "dragon-lady role" through its underscoring the replacement of Kung Fu with Western dance moves. She became close friends with Lee and met his wife and two children. In the 1970s, both Kwan and Lee returned to Hong Kong, where they carried on their companionship.

Kwan divorced Peter Pock in June 1968. She married Hollywood screenwriter David Giler in July 1970 in a civil ceremony in Carson City, Nevada. The marriage was Kwan's second and Giler's first. They divorced in 1971.

That year, Kwan returned to Hong Kong with her son because her father was sick. She initially intended to remain for one year to assist him, but ultimately remained for about seven years. She did not stop her work, starring as Dr. Sue in the film Wonder Women (1973). While in Hong Kong, Kwan founded a production company, Nancy Kwan Films, which made ads mostly for people in Southeast Asia. In the 1980s, she returned to the United States, where she played characters in the television series Fantasy Island, Knots Landing and Trapper John, M.D..

In 1976 Kwan married Norbert Meisel, an actor, director, screenwriter, and producer. Like her first husband Peter Pock, as well as her former fiancé Maximilian Schell, Meisel was Austrian. “I have my Austrian karma,” she said in a 2021 interview. “I think it’s lifetime."

In a 1993 interview with the St. Petersburg Times, Kwan remarked that her son Bernie was frequently called a "blond, blue-eyed Chinese" because he could speak the language fluently. In 1979, the two returned to the United States because Kwan wanted him to finish his schooling there. Bernie was an actor, a martial artist, and a stunt performer. For the 1991 action comedy film Fast Getaway, fellow stunt performer Kenny Bates and he gripped hands and leaped off the Royal Gorge Bridge. They fell 900 ft before being restrained by wire rope 200 ft over the Arkansas River. Bates said their stunt was the "highest 'double drop' ever attempted". Kwan and Bernie recorded a tape about t'ai chi ch'uan.

Later years

In 1987, Nancy Kwan co-owned the dim sum restaurant Joss. Kwan, producer Ray Stark, and restaurateur and Hong Kong film director Cecile Tang financed the restaurant, located on Sunset Strip in West Hollywood.

Kwan sporadically records audiobooks. In 1995, Kwan recorded an audiobook for Anchee Min's memoir Red Azalea in what Publishers Weekly called a "coolly understated performance that allows the story's subtleties and unexpected turns to work by themselves". In 2011, she recorded an audiobook for the 1989 memoir When Heaven and Earth Changed Places by Le Ly Hayslip with Jay Wurts. San Francisco Chronicles Patricia Holt praised Kwan's intonation in her delivery, writing that "Kwan's faint Asian accent and careful pronunciation of Vietnamese words make Hayslip's weaving of her past and present lives a riveting experience".

In 1993, Kwan played Gussie Yang, a "tough-talking, soft-hearted Hong Kong restaurateur", in the fictional Dragon: The Bruce Lee Story. She played a pivotal role in the film, a character based on Seattle restaurateur and political leader Ruby Chow who hires Bruce Lee as a dishwasher and gives him the funds to open a martial arts school.

In May 1993, she completed the production of a film about Eurasians, Loose Woman With No Face, which she wrote, directed, and starred. She called the film "a slice of life about Euro-Asians in Los Angeles, and it's something I know about".

In 1993, Kwan was asked about whether she was confronted with racism as a leading Asian Hollywood actress in the 1960s. Kwan replied, "That was 30 years ago and (prejudice) wasn't such a heavy issue then. I was just in great Broadway productions that were turned into films. I personally never felt any racial problems in Hollywood." In the 1990s, she faced a severe shortage of strong roles. She attributed this to both her age and the movie enterprise's aversion to selecting Asians for non-Asian roles. In earlier years, she was able to play an Italian and a Tahitian.

In the 1990s, there were more Hollywood films about Asians. Kwan could have capitalized on the trend through a role in the 1993 film The Joy Luck Club. Because the filmmakers refused to excise a line calling The World of Suzie Wong a "...horrible racist film," she passed on the role.

In November 1993, Kwan co-starred in the two-character play Arthur and Leila about two siblings who struggle with their Chinese identities. It debuted in the Bay Front Theater in Fort Mason, San Francisco, and moved to Los Angeles two weeks later. Variety reviewer Julio Martinez praised Kwan for her ability to "flo[w] easily between haughty sophistication and girlish insecurity".

In 1994, an article in the South China Morning Post said that she preserved her "dancer's figure" through the Chinese martial art tai chi and frequent dance sessions. That year, she assumed the role of 52-year-old Martha in Singapore Repertory Theatre's showing of Who's Afraid of Virginia Woolf?, an "intense psychological play" by Edward Albee.

In 1995, she produced and acted in the feature film Rebellious. Bernie was the director, writer, and star of the film, which was co-produced by Norbert Meisel.

In 1996, when he was 33, Kwan's son, Bernie, died after contracting AIDS from his girlfriend whom Kwan had cautioned him to avoid. Four years after his death, poet and actress Amber Tamblyn compiled her debut poetry book Of the Dawn and dedicated it to Pock. Tamblyn had acted in Rebellious when she was nine, alongside her father Russ Tamblyn. Calling Pock a "big brother", she said he was the "first guy" to convince her to share her poems.

Nancy Kwan has appeared on television commercials even into the 1990s and appeared in "late night infomercials" as the spokesperson for the cosmetic "Oriental Pearl Cream".

Kwan has been involved in philanthropy for AIDS awareness. In 1997, she published A Celebration of Life – Memories of My Son, a book about her son who died after being infected by HIV. She gave profits from both the book and a movie she created about him to supporting the study of AIDS and the promotion of AIDS awareness.

On March 17, 2006, cheongsam-wearing Kwan and her husband, Norbert Meisel, attended the debut performance of Hong Kong Ballet's depiction of Suzie Wong at Sha Tin Town Hall. Kwan told The Kansas City Star in 2007 that she did not consider retiring, leads to trouble. Retirees, she professed, frequently find themselves with nothing to do because they have not readied themselves for it. Kwan said, "I hope I'm working until the day I die. If work is a pleasure, why not?" In 2006, Kwan reunited with Flower Drum Song co-star James Shigeta to perform A. R. Gurney's two-person play Love Letters. They performed the play at Los Angeles' East West Players and San Francisco's Herbst Theatre.

Kwan appeared in Arthur Dong's 2007 documentary Hollywood Chinese, where other Chinese dignitaries and she discussed the past accomplishments and the impending plight of Chinese people in the film industry.
Kwan and her husband Norbert Meisel write and direct films about Asian-Americans. Kwan believes that Asians are not cast in enough films and TV shows. Meisel and she resolved to create their own scripts and films about Asian characters. In 2007, they wrote, directed, and produced Star of Sunshine, a Bildungsroman film starring Boys Don't Cry actress Cheyenne Rushing, who plays Rachel. An ardent pianist in an conflicted household, Rachel journeys to find her restless father, a musician who deserted her when she was a mere child. In Sunshine, Rachel is supported by Kwan, the manager of a jazz club, who knows a mystery about her. In the film's final scene, Kwan dances, an activity she has enjoyed since her youth.

Kwan wrote an introduction for the 2008 book For Goodness Sake: A Novel of the Afterlife of Suzie Wong written by American author James Clapp using the pen name Sebastian Gerard. Clapp became acquainted with Kwan through director Brian Jamieson, who was filming a documentary about Kwan's life.

Kwan serves as a spokeswoman for the Asian American Voters Coalition, a pan-Asian political organization established in 1986 to aid Asian actors.

In her performing arts career, Kwan has appeared in two television series and over 50 films. The Straits Times reported in March 2011 that Kwan continues to serve as a film screenwriter and executive.

Kwan currently resides in Los Angeles and has family members in Hong Kong. Once every few years, she travels to the former colony.

Filmography

Film

Television

Awards
 1961 Golden Globe Award for Best Actress - Drama (Nominated) for The World of Suzie Wong
 1961 Golden Globe Award for Most Promising Newcomer – Female, shared with Ina Balin and Hayley Mills
 Golden Ring Award
 Historymaker for Excellence in the Performing Arts – Chinese American Museum of Los Angeles, California
 Visionary Award – East West Players, April 28, 2003
 Lifetime Achievement Award – Chinatown, Los Angeles, June 2009
 Maverick Award – Hawaii International Film Festival, October 2010
 Lifetime Achievement Award – San Diego Asian Film Festival, October 2011
 Lifetime Achievement Award – Museum of Chinese in America, November 2015

Bibliography

See also
 Anna May Wong, a Chinese-American Hollywood actress, active in the early 20th century
 Kevin Kwan, Singapore-American author, distant cousin to Nancy Kwan

References

Notes

Footnotes

Bibliography

External links

 
 
 Nancy Kwan interview cnn.com April 14, 2010

1939 births
American actresses of Chinese descent
American film actresses
American people of Chinese descent
American people of English descent
American people of Scottish descent
American women restaurateurs
American restaurateurs
American television actresses
Hong Kong emigrants to the United States
Hong Kong people of English descent
Hong Kong people of Scottish descent
Living people
New Star of the Year (Actress) Golden Globe winners
People educated at the Royal Ballet School